David Goffin was the defending champion but decided to participate at the 2013 Sony Open Tennis instead.
Benoît Paire won the final 6–4, 5–7, 6–4 against Sergiy Stakhovsky to win the title.

Seeds

Draw

Finals

Top half

Bottom half

References
 Main Draw
 Qualifying Draw

Orange Open Guadeloupe - Singles
2013 Singles